Cheshmeh Khalil (also Romanized as Cheshmeh Khalīl, Chashmeh Khalīl, Chashmeh-ye Khalīl, and Cheshmeh-ye Khalīl; also known as Shashma Khalil) is a village in Khosrowabad Rural District, Chang Almas District, Bijar County, Kurdistan Province, Iran. At the 2006 census, its population was 56, in 14 families. The village is populated by Kurds.

References 

Towns and villages in Bijar County
Kurdish settlements in Kurdistan Province